was the fifth of ten s built for the Imperial Japanese Navy in the mid-1930s under the Circle Two Supplementary Naval Expansion Program (Maru Ni Keikaku).

History
The Asashio-class destroyers were larger and more capable that the preceding , as Japanese naval architects were no longer constrained by the provisions of the London Naval Treaty. These light cruiser-sized vessels were designed to take advantage of Japan’s lead in torpedo technology, and to accompany the Japanese main striking force and in both day and night attacks against the United States Navy as it advanced across the Pacific Ocean, according to Japanese naval strategic projections. Despite being one of the most powerful classes of destroyers in the world at the time of their completion, none survived the Pacific War.

Asagumo, built at the Kawasaki Shipyards in Kobe was laid down on December 23, 1936, launched on November 5, 1937 and commissioned on March 31, 1938.

Operational history
At the time of the attack on Pearl Harbor, Asagumo was assigned to Destroyer Division 9 (Desdiv 9), and a member of Destroyer Squadron 4 (Desron 4) of the IJN 2nd Fleet, escorting Admiral Nobutake Kondō's Southern Force Main Body out of Mako Guard District as distant cover to the Malaya and Philippines invasion forces in December 1941.

In early 1942, Asagumo escorted troop convoys to Lingayen, Tarakan, Balikpapan and Makassar in the Netherlands East Indies. During the Battle of the Java Sea, she assisted in sinking the British destroyer , but suffered several hits and the temporary disabling of her engines from the British ship, which  killed four crewmen and wounded 19 others. On 18 March, after emergency repairs at Balikpapan, she escorted the repair ship Yamabiko Maru to Makassar, and returned at the end of the month to the Yokosuka Naval Arsenal for repairs.

At the end of May, Asagumo joined the escort for the Midway Invasion Force during the Battle of Midway. In July, she was sent to northern waters, patrolling from Ōminato Guard District towards the Kurile Islands. Afterwards, she was sent south to Truk together with the cruiser , and onwards to Kwajalein, returning to Yokosuka on 8 August 1942.

Returning to Truk later that month, Asagumo provided support in the Battle of the Eastern Solomons.  From September, she was assigned to patrols from Truk towards Shortland, and in October and November was assigned to nine "Tokyo Express" high speed transport operations in the Solomon Islands. During this time, she was made the flagship of the 4th Torpedo Squadron, and participated in the Battle of Santa Cruz. During the First Naval Battle of Guadalcanal on 12 November, she assisted in sinking the American destroyer  and damaging the cruiser , and afterward assisted the damaged destroyer . During the Second Naval Battle of Guadalcanal, she rescued survivors from the battleship . At the end of the year, she returned to Yokosuka in the company of the aircraft carrier .

Returning to Truk in mid-January 1943 in the company of the aircraft carrier , she conveyed a convoy to Wewak in New Guinea. During the remainder of January and February, she assisted in the evacuation of surviving Japanese forces from Guadalcanal and other points in the Solomon Islands.

During the Battle of the Bismarck Sea of 1–4 March she survived numerous air attacks while rescuing survivors from various sunken vessels. During the remainder of March and first week of April, she made several transport runs to reinforce the Japanese position at Kolombangara. She returned to Yokosuka for repairs on 13 April.

After repairs were completed in late May, Asagumo was based at Paramushiro in the Kurile Islands. At the end of October, she was reassigned to the IJN 3rd Fleet. She was also modified by the removal of her X-turret, which was replaced by two triple Type 96 25 mm AT/AA Guns.

Asagumo returned to Truk in early January 1944 to escort the battleship  back to Kure Naval Arsenal. She escorted a convoy to Tawitawi in May, from which she escorted the battleship  to Davao. During the Battle of the Philippine Sea in June, she was part of Admiral Ozawa's force, but sent on detached duty to Okinawa owing to fuel problems. In July, she returned to Manila, and was in Brunei in mid-October.

In October, she was assigned to Vice Admiral Shōji Nishimura's fleet at the Battle of Surigao Strait, Asagumo was torpedoed by the destroyer  and subsequently finished off by gunfire from US Navy cruisers and destroyers at position. Of her crew, 191 were killed, but 39 survivors, including her captain, Commander Shibayama, were taken prisoner by the Americans. Asagumo was removed from the navy list on 10 January 1945.

It was said that she had rescued survivors of the battleship .

Her wreck was discovered by RV Petrel in late 2017, with her hull and superstructure mostly intact.

Notes

References
 
 
 
 
 
 
 
 
Cox, Jeffrey R (2014) Rising Sun, Falling Skies: The Disastrous Java Sea Campaign of World War II. Osprey.

External links
  CombinedFleet.com: Asashio-class destroyers
  CombinedFleet.com: Asagumo history
 GlobalSecurity.org: Asashio class destroyers

Asashio-class destroyers
World War II destroyers of Japan
World War II shipwrecks in the Philippine Sea
Ships built by Kawasaki Heavy Industries
1937 ships
Maritime incidents in October 1944
Shipwreck discoveries by Paul Allen
Shipwrecks in the Surigao Strait
2017 archaeological discoveries